John Frederick Waley Sanderson (born 10 September 1954) is an English former first-class cricketer.

Sanderson was born at Highgate in September 1954. He later studied at New College at the University of Oxford, where he played first-class cricket for Oxford University. His debut came against Worcestershire at Oxford in 1979, with Sanderson playing first-class cricket for Oxford until 1980, making a total of six appearances. Playing as a right-arm medium pace bowler, he took 10 wickets at an average of 28.20. He took one five wicket haul, with figures of 6 for 67 against Middlesex in 1980.

References

External links

1954 births
Living people
People from Highgate
Alumni of New College, Oxford
English cricketers
Oxford University cricketers